Hidden Valley High School may refer to:

 Hidden Valley High School (Oregon), Grants Pass, Oregon
 Hidden Valley High School (Virginia), Roanoke, Virginia